Mindaugas Rojus (born 24 January 1981 in Darbėnai, Kretinga district, Lithuania) is a Lithuanian opera singer (tenor / baritone), a soloist of Klaipėda State Music Theatre, and a member of a stage duo Žemaitijos perlai (Samogitia's Pearls).

Biography 

Graduated high school of Darbėnai. In Klaipėda, Stasys Šimkus Conservatory he studied choral conducting (class of A. Purlienė) and solo singing (class of V. Balsytė). In 2001 and 2002, attended the Lithuanian Academy of Music preparatory studies (class of prof. Vladimiras Prudnikovas). Since 2004, he studied at Klaipėda University's Faculty of Arts Singing Department (class of M. Gylys, prof. Eduardas Kaniava), gained a master's degree.

He has two siblings – a younger sister, Sandra, and an older brother, Rimantas. With Klaipėda State Music Theatre ballerina Viktorija Gulnickaja has a son Augustinas Rojus (born June 9, 2010). Currently lives in a Lithuania's seaport town Klaipėda.

Roles 

In 2006, he won the audition for the role of Eugene Onegin and straight after that was invited to work in Klaipėda State Music Theatre. Notable roles:

 Onegin – in Pyotr Tchaikovsky opera Eugene Onegin
 Germont – in Giuseppe Verdi opera La traviata
 Aristide – in Paul Abraham operetta Ball im Savoy
 Prince Ypsheim – in Johann Strauss operetta Wiener Blut
 Jake – in musical drama Passion Spree by George Gershwin opera Porgy and Bess
 Pelléas – in opera readings Pelléas and Mélisande by Claude Debussy music and Maurice Maeterlinck play
 Eisenstein – in Johann Strauss operetta Die Fledermaus 
 Boy – in Audronė Žigaitytė opera–phantasmagoria Frank'Einstein: The 21st Century
 Phoebus – in Zigmars Liepins' opera–melodrama Notre-Dame de Paris by Victor Hugo novel
 Fiorello – in Gioachino Rossini opera The Barber of Seville
 Juozelis – in Giedrius Kuprevičius musical Veronica
 Radish – in Antanas Kučinskas opera Potato's Tale
 Brother – in Vidmantas Bartulis opera Morning Star
 Pjeras – in Jurgis Gaižauskas opera Pinocchio
 Herstwood – in Raimond Pauls musical Sister Carrie
 Rohnsdorff – in Imre Kalman operetta Die Csárdásfürstin
 Perchik – in Jerry Bock musical Fiddler on the Roof
 Dido – in Henry Purcell opera Dido and Aeneas
 Gianni Schicchi – in Giacomo Puccini opera Gianni Schicchi

Baritone parts in other works:

 In Gabriel Fauré choral–orchestral setting of the Roman Catholic Mass for the Dead Requiem for baritone, soprano and chorus
 In Carl Orff scenic cantata Carmina Burana for tenor, baritone, soprano and chorus

Other projects 

In 2009, he participated LTV and LTV World opera singers contest Triumfo arka (Triumphal Arch) where he was one of the viewers' biggest favorites, reached semifinal. Performed Mister X aria "Zwei Märchenaugen" from Imre Kalman operetta The Circus Princess, Xerxes aria "Ombra mai fu" from Georg Friedrich Händel opera Serse, Don Quixote aria "The Impossible Dream (The Quest)" from Mitch Leigh musical Man of La Mancha, Germont's aria "Di Provenza il mar" from Giuseppe Verdi opera La traviata, Yeletsky's aria "I love you beyond measure" from Pyotr Tchaikovsky opera The Queen of Spades, and others.

Collaborates with his colleague from Klaipėda State Music Theatre, soprano Loreta Ramelienė as a stage duo Žemaitijos perlai (Samogitia's Pearls). Its repertoire includes well known classical music pieces and pop songs. Also cooperates with the Kretinga School of Art ensemble Lyra, with whom he released an album.

Performed in Lithuania, Poland, Latvia, Russia, Italy, Germany, participated in music competitions (Jūrmala festival, the International Belvedere Competition of soloists etc.

Awards 
The winner of Vox Rotary, a Republican contest of young vocalists, and the recipient of J. Augaitytė Prize, as well as the graduate of international Imre Kalman Competition (2008, Moscow), where he also won a special prize for the best interpretation of Johann Strauss' piece.

In 2009, for the role of Prince Ypsheim in Johann Strauss operetta Wiener Blut he was nominated for The Golden Cross of the Stage.

Discography 
 
 2004 – Kartu (with Lyra).
 2009 – Giedrius Kuprevičius. Musical Veronica, Klaipėda State Music Theatre.
 Triumfo arka. Auksiniai balsai II (CD / DVD, released in 2010) includes his performings of Hussar's song from Imre Kalman operetta The Circus Princess and a Neapolitan song O Surdato 'Nnamurato by Aniello Califano and Enrico Cannio.
 In 2011, M. Rojus recorded an official anthem of Šventoji – Šventas krantas (Šventosios himnas) (lyrics by known Lithuanian writer and poet Vidmantė Jasukaitytė).

References

External links 

 Music.lt profile
 YouTube channel
 MySpace profile
 Facebook page
 Supermuzika profile
 SoundCloud profile
 Myliumuzika.lt profile

1981 births
Living people
People from Kretinga District Municipality
Lithuanian opera singers
Operatic baritones
21st-century Lithuanian male singers
Lithuanian Academy of Music and Theatre alumni
21st-century male opera singers